Dennis T. Phalen (April 29, 1856 - April 25, 1922) was a member of the Wisconsin State Assembly and the Wisconsin State Senate.

Biography
Phalen was born on April 29, 1856, in Lima, Sheboygan County, Wisconsin. He died at his home in Sheboygan, Wisconsin on April 25, 1922.

Career
Phalen was elected District Attorney of Sheboygan County, Wisconsin in 1882 and 1884 and was a member of the local board of education from 1885 to 1888. He was a member of the Assembly during the 1891 session and of the Senate during the 1893 and 1895 sessions. Phalen was later City Attorney of Sheboygan until his death. He was a Democrat.

References

Politicians from Sheboygan, Wisconsin
Democratic Party Wisconsin state senators
Democratic Party members of the Wisconsin State Assembly
District attorneys in Wisconsin
Wisconsin city attorneys
School board members in Wisconsin
1856 births
1922 deaths
People from Lima, Sheboygan County, Wisconsin
20th-century American lawyers
19th-century American lawyers